The  is a privately owned, ridable  gauge electric garden railway in the Toyono District of Osaka Prefecture, Japan.

Visitors are allowed to drive the trains. In total, the track has 13 switches. An overhead line is used to transmit electricity at 36 volts DC to trams and locomotives.

The railway opens to the public on the afternoon on the first Sunday every month. It is named after a mine that was once located there.

Rolling stock 
, the following rolling stock is used on the line.

References

External links 
 

Transport in Osaka Prefecture
15 in gauge railways in Japan